Mylocrita acratopis is a moth in the family Elachistidae, and the only species in the genus Mylocrita. It was described by Edward Meyrick in 1922. It is found in Australia.

References

Moths described in 1922
Elachistidae
Moths of Australia